The NV5600 is a Heavy Duty close ratio 6-speed manual transmission that was used in 1999-2005 Dodge RAM 2500 and 3500 Series ¾ ton and 1 ton Trucks with the 5.9L Cummins Engines.

It was manufactured by New Venture Gear, a division of Magna Powertrain.

Specifications
 The NV5600 takes a special lubricant, not gear oil. The Mopar part number is 4874464. Transmissions specific 5W30.  5W30 motor oil is not recommended.  5W30 "synchromesh" only.
 Input Torque 550ft-lb
 Weight 360lbs
 Oil Capacity 9.5 Pints (10 w/optional filter)
Close Ratio NV5600 Gearing:

Several aftermarket companies are now making the short throw shifter for the NV5600  which gives the transmission a smoother engagement and driving experience.

References

New Venture transmissions